Fishers Island (Pequot: Munnawtawkit) is an island that is part of Southold, New York, United States at the eastern end of Long Island Sound,  off the southeastern coast of Connecticut across Fishers Island Sound. It is accessible from New London by plane and regular ferry service.

The island is part of the town of Southold in Suffolk County. It is a census-designated place (CDP). The population rises to about 2,000 during peak summer weekends, as throngs disembark on the island from Connecticut.

Geography

Fishers Island represents a section of the same terminal moraine that formed the North Fork of Long Island, which comes ashore at Watch Hill, Rhode Island. During the late phase of the Wisconsin glaciation, glacial Lake Connecticut formed at the retreating fore edge of the ice sheet, over what now is Long Island Sound; it formed an outlet in its moraine dam at The Race, famous for rip currents, which still separates Fishers Island from the North Fork. Fishers Island is essentially a long barrow of rocky till scoured from the surface of southern Connecticut.

Neighboring islands
Wicopesset Island is a small, unoccupied island just off East Point on Fisher's Island, closer to the water boundary with Rhode Island and Connecticut than to Montauk Point. However, Montauk gets the title of New York's easternmost land point because it is  farther east. Wicopesset Island is the northernmost area of Suffolk County, New York, 

North Dumpling Island is a small, privately owned island north of the coast of North Hill, that also serves as the home of the North Dumpling Lighthouse.

South Dumpling Island is another small island north of the coast of North Hill, that is located southeast of North Dumpling Island. It is privately owned by the Audubon Society and is managed as a bird sanctuary. Angelica (Angelica lucida), a plant species that is endangered in New York state, has been documented on South Dumpling Island.

Flat Hammock is located slightly east of South Dumpling and is owned by the United States Government.

Mason's Island (Algonquin: Chippachaug, meaning a separated place) is an inhabited island at the mouth of the Mystic River in Stonington, Connecticut. The island was named after Major John Mason who was granted the island in recognition of his military services in the 1637 Pequot War in nearby Mystic.

Enders Island is an inhabited island located in Stonington, Connecticut, used as a Catholic retreat center, owned and operated by the Society of Saint Edmund. The island is connected to neighboring Mason's Island by a causeway, and Mason's Island is connected to the mainland by another causeway.

Goat Island is in Wequetequock Cove northeast of Sandy Point Island and Elihu Island.

Ram Island is close in proximity to Fishers Island. However, Ram Island still remains within the political jurisdiction of Connecticut.

Elihu Island of Stonington, Connecticut, is also close to Fishers Island.
It is just south of Goat Island in Wequetequock Cove.

Climate
Fishers Island's weather is influenced by the proximity of Long Island Sound and the ocean, and prevailing winds that generally blow offshore. The climate is one of only a few locations on an east coast in the Northern Hemisphere that is oceanic (Koppen Cfb). Because the ocean stays warm during the fall and winter months, Fishers Island stays warmer than the mainland (Connecticut) during this time. Although summer days can be hot on Fishers Island, because of its oceanic climate, temperatures are lower than on the mainland in nearby Connecticut and Rhode Island.  For example, the July and August, average daytime temperature on the island usually range in mid- to upper 70s when they average in the low to mid-80s in nearby areas of New England.

History

The island was called Munnawtawkit by the Pequot Natives. Adriaen Block, the first recorded European visitor, named it Vischer's Island in 1614 after one of his companions. For the next 25 years, it remained a wilderness, visited occasionally by Dutch traders.

John Winthrop the Younger obtained a grant of Fisher's Island in 1640 from the Massachusetts Bay Colony, "reserving the right of Connecticut if it should be decided to be theirs." He simultaneously applied to the Connecticut General Court for a similar grant in order that there might be no flaw in his title. The title was given to him in the following words, which are copied from the records of a General Court held at Hartford, Connecticut, April 9, 1641:
Upon Mr. Winthrop's motion to the court for Fisher's Island, it is the mind of the court that so far as it hinders not the public good of the country, either for fortifying for defense, or setting up a trade for fishing or salt and such like, he shall have liberty to proceed therein.

Winthrop lived only one winter on the island. He was named governor of the Connecticut Colony 1657–58 and 1659–76, and he used the island to raise sheep for food and wool. He died in 1676 and his son Fitz-John installed a lessee farmer from England on the island named William Walworth. Walworth brought a system of cultivation that was continued on the island for nearly 200 years. He established farmland out of the heavily forested island. Walworth and his family vacated the island nine years later due to the threat of pirates. Fishers Island remained in the Winthrop family of Connecticut until 1863, when ownership passed to Robert R. Fox, and then to Edmund and Walton Ferguson, also of Connecticut.

The island was the subject of a border dispute between New York and Connecticut. The states of New York, Connecticut, and Rhode Island meet in the waters east of Fishers Island. Before the British took possession of New York City from the Dutch in 1664, all of Suffolk County was claimed by Connecticut, with British settlers there accepting its jurisdiction. A 1664 land patent given to the Duke of York included all islands in Long Island Sound, apparently thus granting Fishers Island also to the Province of New York. The Duke of York held a grudge against Connecticut, as the New Haven settlers had hidden three of the judges who sentenced his father King Charles I to death in 1649. Settlers throughout Suffolk County pressed to stay part of Connecticut, but Governor Sir Edmund Andros threatened to eliminate their rights to land if they did not yield, which they did by 1676. A joint commission from Connecticut and New York in 1879 reiterated that New York has legal title to Fishers Island.

The island was a target of British soldiers during the Revolutionary War, who raided islands in Long Island Sound for supplies. Many of the residents of Fishers Island took their herds to the relative safety of Connecticut in 1776. The raids continued, though, and the British burned many of the island's homes in 1779.

In 1783, brick-making was established as the island's only industry, using the vast amounts of available clay. This business was discontinued in 1889. In 1870, a lifesaving station was erected at the western end of the island by the State of Connecticut, which overlooked the waters between Fishers Island and Little Gull Island. In the early 1900s, a permanent Coast Guard station was built on the west end. In 1898, the Fergusons sold  on the western end to the federal government. This land was developed as Fort H.G. Wright, which was named after the Civil War Union commander who was born in Clinton, Connecticut. The fort was established as part of the Endicott Program, a large coastal defense project. It was largely abandoned following World War II. Over the years, Fort Wright drew a large number of residents to the island. The 1890s brought a growing summer population and the construction of the Fishers Island Yacht Club.

The E.W. & W. Ferguson business was established to manage the Mansion House Hotel and Cottages, a ferry service, and the electricity, water, and telephone enterprises. It was renamed Fishers Island Farms in 1918, then the Fishers Island Utility Company  in 1965, following the death of a company president. As of 2022, the firm still owns and operates the water, telephone service (area code 631, exchange 788), and electrical utilities. The ferry is operated by the Fishers Island Ferry District, a public entity financed through a special tax district. The town has contracts with the Ferry District to operate Elizabeth Field airport and to manage other structures that were part of Fort Wright.

Hurricanes have played an important role in the island's history, with the Great September Gale of 1815 and the New England Hurricane of 1938 causing widespread damage. The 1815 storm destroyed nearly of the trees with powerful winds and a  storm surge that flooded coastal towns. The consequences for Fishers Island were visible for almost a century and a half. A 1910 panoramic photograph shows more boats in Hay and West harbors than there are mature trees. Until the 1950s, Fishers Island had the look of Ireland: stone walls, few trees, and windswept moors.

The 1938 storm blew in seeds, returning Fishers to its pre-1815 foliage. The damage from this storm was less severe than the 1815 storm, with only a few local residences destroyed, primarily by wind. (Most Fishers Island residences have sitings above sea level that protect them from storm surge.) Winds in excess of  ripped off the roof of John Nicholas Brown's ultra-modern residence Windshield, designed by Richard Neutra, which had only recently been completed. The Browns rebuilt Windshield, but it was destroyed by fire in the early 1970s.

Culture

The island has closer links with Connecticut,  to its north, than with the rest of New York,  to the southwest.

Tom Clavin of The New York Times wrote that "the connection remains merely political, not emotional" to New York State, and that "In appearance, accent, location and sensibility, this is a decidedly New England community".

Fishers Island's ZIP code is 06390, corresponding to Connecticut ZIP codes that begin with "06", while other residential ZIP codes in New York State begin with "1". The island is the only point in Suffolk County to which telephone calls placed from the greater New York City area are classified as long distance rather than regional; indeed, any telephone call placed from Fishers Island to anywhere else is treated as long distance.  The island's local telephone service is provided by the Fishers Island Telephone Company, which is not part of the former Bell System—the only place on Long Island of which this is true (all telephone numbers on the island are on the 788 exchange within the 631 area code).  The island is also part of the Boy Scouts of America's Connecticut Rivers Council. The island is part of the Roman Catholic Diocese of Norwich (Connecticut), while the remainder of Suffolk County is included in the Diocese of Rockville Centre.

The only way for New York state troopers to get to Fishers Island is to travel through Connecticut and take the ferry from New London. , there was no ferry service to Long Island.

Every athletic team at Fishers Island School plays against Connecticut teams; none of the teams from the school played against any New York team in 2011-2012. Trash from the island is sent to Wallingford, Connecticut. Residents also closely adhere to Connecticut's state laws regarding recycling.

Since the turn of the 20th century, well-established and old-money families—which includes names like Rockefeller, duPont, Firestone, Whitney and Roosevelt—have selected the island as the destination for their summer vacation, and their luxurious dwellings (the island's exclusive estates) reflect an emphasis on continuity and tradition.  It is, Cleveland Amory once wrote, the last resort of the big rich, and they want it kept that way. The island's more notable residents include former Governor Thomas Kean of New Jersey; former CIA Director Porter Goss; filmmaker Albert Maysles; former Whitney Museum director Tom Armstrong; former Kidder, Peabody & Co. Chairman Albert Gordon; Scudder Sinclair, president of the Sinclair Pharmacal Co. Inc. (previously based on Fishers Island where Boroleum ointment was tubed); author Rick Moody, who wrote The Ice Storm; and the heirs to IBM. Efrem Zimbalist, violinist, and his wife, the opera singer, Alma Gluck, owned and used the G. B. Linderman summer mansion on Fishers Island in the 1920s and 30s. There, they held house parties for eminent musicians of their day.

Most of the year-round residents of the island reside on the western end of the island. The island offers all the necessities for small-town life, including a K-12 school (Fishers Island School), bowling alley, movie theater, liquor store, grocery store, two gas stations, volunteer fire department, and post office. The west end also has a small air strip, a museum, an ice cream shop (Toppers), two boutiques (The Beach Plum and Island Outfitters), a hardware store (Island Hardware), and a restaurant-bar (The Pequot).  One of the main streets on Fishers Island is named after Connecticut's John Winthrop the Younger. The island is also home to the Fishers Island Oyster Farm, a family-owned and managed suspension-culture oyster farm that sells oysters directly to customers and chefs, including Manhattan restaurants such as Balthazar and PJ Clarke’s.

The seaside scenes in the movie The World According to Garp, starring Robin Williams and Glenn Close, were shot on Fishers Island on and about the grounds of the mansion originally built by Bethlehem Steel heir Robert Linderman. Many other movies have also been filmed there.

Recreation
The island has several beaches and a harbor, two country clubs, and a yacht club.
 
The best-known beaches include South Beach, Isabella Beach, and Chocomount Beach.

West Harbor, a large harbor that is used mainly by the yacht club, is home to Dock Beach. The smallest beach on the island, it hosts barbecues and family events. It is also a prime location from which to view the Dupont fireworks display, administered by FIOA (Fishers Island's Own Army), on the Fourth of July.

Fishers Island Club, known as "The Big Club," is at the island's eastern tip and owns a Seth Raynor-designed links golf course that was rated ninth on Golf Digest's 2009 list of America's 100 greatest golf courses. President Dwight D. Eisenhower called it a "real course" in a July 1957 letter to John Hay Whitney. The club also has four tennis courts, a beach club, and a members-only beachfront. The main clubhouse has two dining rooms capable of seating 250 people. There is also housing for more than 40 employees on the island. Since 1970, the club has hosted the annual HOG (Harbor Open Golf) golf tournament, which benefits the Island Health Project which helps to provide year-round medical care to everyone on the island.

Hay Harbor is a smaller club on the west part of the island with a nine-hole links-style golf course whose second hole that runs along the ocean. Its tennis club has 11 clay tennis courts, a swimming pool, and a salt water swimming area called the Shark Tank. Hay Harbor also maintains a sailing club. 

Fishers Island Yacht Club (FIYC) holds races every Saturday during the summer. There are two active racing fleets: the International One Designs (IODs) of  boats designed in 1936 by Bjarne Aas of Norway, and the Bullseyes,  boats designed by Nathanael Herreshoff in 1914. The club has two small buildings and is casual. It hosts several parties during the summer, as well as weekly picnic barbecues.

Demographics

As of the census of 2000, there were 289 people, 138 households, and 77 families residing in the CDP. The population density was 71.3 per square mile (27.6/km2). There were 625 housing units at an average density of 154.2/sq mi (59.6/km2). The racial makeup of the community was 95.50% White, 1.04% African American, 1.04% Asian, and 2.42% from two or more races. Hispanic or Latino of any race were 1.38% of the population. More than 53% of inhabitants of the island have mainland homes in Connecticut.

There were 138 households, out of which 26.1% had children under the age of 18 living with them, 44.2% were married couples living together, 5.1% had a female householder with no husband present, and 43.5% were non-families. 34.8% of all households were made up of individuals, and 10.1% had someone living alone who was 65 years of age or older. The average household size was 2.09 and the average family size was 2.72.

In the CDP, the population was spread out, with 21.8% under the age of 18, 2.1% from 18 to 24, 30.8% from 25 to 44, 27.3% from 45 to 64, and 18.0% who were 65 years of age or older. The median age was 43 years. For every 100 females, there were 105.0 males. For every 100 females age 18 and over, there were 98.2 males.

The median income for a household in the community was $50,521, and the median income for a family was $59,583. Males had a median income of $47,917 versus $26,250 for females. The per capita income for the CDP was $31,652. About 4.5% of families and 9.0% of the population were below the poverty line, including 9.8% of those under the age of eighteen and 7.9% of those 65 or over.

Home owners currently pay New York sales tax, property tax, etc.

Politics
In 2004, two officials in the Southhold government were from Fishers Island. Clavin said Fishers Island residents felt this was inadequate and that the removal of a Fishers Island resident from the Southhold zoning board of appeals led to calls for secession from New York and incorporation into Connecticut.

Education
Fishers Island Union Free School District is located at 19 Greenwood Road and consists of one school that serves 68 students in grades PK through 12. In 2014, the district spent $36,811 per pupil.  The district spends 71% on instruction, and 29% on support services. The district's student-teacher ratio is five students for every full-time equivalent teacher.

References

External links

FishersIsland.net, includes current news, events, history, organization and business directories
Fishers Island School
Fishers Island Ferry District

Southold, New York
Long Island Sound
Census-designated places in New York (state)
Islands of Suffolk County, New York
Census-designated places in Suffolk County, New York
Islands of New York (state)